Sando is an Australian television comedy series which first began airing from 21 March 2018 on ABC.

Plot
Australia's discount furniture queen, Victoria "Sando" Sandringham needs to reconnect with her family to revive her business and find personal redemption. The only problem is they mostly hate her. Mostly.

It centers on Sando who runs a large wholesale furniture business.  Sadly, as successful as she once was in business (over 135 stores) she is careless and reckless in her personal life.

On her daughter Susie's wedding day, she got a text revealing that she was pregnant; the father was Kevin, Susie's bridegroom.

After ten years of separation, Sando finds her life in utter turmoil as her careless party-giving ways get the best of her.

On the brink of losing her business, she has no choice but to turn to her daughter Susie, now happily married to Gary and starting up an internet company that Sando wants to exploit.

Adding to the chaos are ex-husband Don, man-child son Eric, ten-year-old son Vic Jr. and baby-daddy Kevin, as well as Nicky, a "therapist" who is both Susie's best friend and in love with Don.

Cast
 Sacha Horler as Sando
 Phil Lloyd as Don Sandringham
 Krew Boylan as Susie Sandringham
 Adele Vuko as Nicky Di Napoli
 Dylan Hesp as Eric Sandringham
 Uli Latukefu as Gary
 Firass Dirani as Kevin Keenan
 Rob Carlton as Tony

Episodes

References

External links

Australian Broadcasting Corporation original programming
Australian comedy television series
2018 Australian television series debuts
2018 Australian television series endings
English-language television shows